Nagyar is a village in Szabolcs-Szatmár-Bereg county, in the Northern Great Plain region of eastern Hungary.

A lot of noted people have borned here. Like Luby Zsigmond, Karmacsi Bertalan or Kozák Tamás.

Petőfi Sándor wroted his poem "Tisza" here at down of Petőfi-fa.

Geography

References

Nagyar